In mathematics, the Heine–Stieltjes polynomials or Stieltjes polynomials, introduced by , are polynomial solutions of a second-order Fuchsian equation, a differential equation all of whose singularities are regular.  The Fuchsian equation has the form

for some polynomial V(z) of degree at most N − 2, and if this has a polynomial solution S then V is called a Van Vleck polynomial (after Edward Burr Van Vleck) and S is called a Heine–Stieltjes polynomial.

Heun polynomials are the special cases of Stieltjes polynomials when the differential equation has four singular points.

References

Polynomials